Canalispira umuhlwa is a species of sea snail, a marine gastropod mollusk, in the family Cystiscidae.

Distribution
This marine species occurs off KwaZulu, South Africa.

References

 Lussi M. & Smith G. (1998) Family Cystiscidae Stimpson, 1865. Revision of the family Cystiscidae in South Africa with the introduction of three genera and the description of eight new species. Malacologia Mostra Mondiale 27: 3-23.
 Kilburn, R.N. (1990). The genus Canalispira Jousseaume, 1875 in southern Africa (Mollusca: Gastropoda: Marginellidae). Annals of the Natal Museum. 31: 215–221

External links
 McCleery T. & Wakefield A. (2007). A review of the enigmatic genus Canalispira Jousseaume, 1875 (Gastropoda: Cystiscidae) with the description of three new species from the western Atlantic. Novapex. 8(1): 1-10

Endemic fauna of South Africa
umuhlwa
Gastropods described in 1990